The 1992–93 Women's National League Cup was a football competition in England organised by the Women's Football Association. It was the second edition of the competition, which was later run by the Football Association as the Women's Premier League Cup and is now known as the FA Women's National League Cup .

The League Cup included top-flight clubs from the season's 1992–93 WFA National League Premier Division and second-tier clubs of the Northern and Southern Divisions.

In the final at Wembley, the defending 1991–92 League Cup-winners, Arsenal, retained the trophy and completed a domestic treble in 1992–93.

Wembley final
Arsenal and Knowsley United won their respective semi-finals against Wimbledon L.F.C. and Leasowe Pacific.

The 1992–93 competition ended with a final at Wembley Stadium in London. Kicking off at 12.15pm on 29 May 1993, the women's final was held prior to the men's Third Division play-off final at the venue.

Before a sparse crowd, Arsenal Ladies beat Knowsley United 3–0 to retain the trophy. The Liverpool Echo reported that the three Arsenal goals were all scored in the second half. Arsenal had won the WFA Cup a month earlier by the same scoreline.

Knowsley's squad contained three England regulars, Karen Burke, Clare Taylor and Kerry Davis. Taylor was an international footballer and cricketer, and two months after the League Cup final she was in the England team that won the 1993 Women's Cricket World Cup on 1 August; she became the first woman to play in finals at Wembley and Lord's, and did so in the same year.

Arsenal manager Vic Akers recalled that the women's teams were not given use of the main dressing rooms at Wembley. "We changed in the opposite end to where the tunnel was."

This remains the only women's League Cup or National League Cup final to be played at Wembley. It is also one of the only competitive women's club games held at the old Wembley Stadium. Previously, the venue had hosted the England women's team and a 1990 friendly between Doncaster Belles and Friends of Fulham. The only regular women's football at Wembley has been the FA Cup final, annually since 2015.

References

External links
Results at The Owl Soccer Historian

1992–93 in English women's football
FA Women's National League Cup
1992–93 domestic association football cups